Peter John Allan (born 31 December 1935) is a former Australian cricketer who played in one Test in 1965.

Life and career
A tall right-arm fast-medium bowler, Allan made his first-class debut for Queensland in the 1959-60 season, but after that he spent some time working in Victoria, and did not establish himself in cricket until he returned to Queensland in 1963.  After consistent good form in the Sheffield Shield he toured the West Indies with the Australian side in 1964-65 but fell ill early in the tour and did not play in the Tests.

He opened the bowling in the First Test at Brisbane in the 1965–66 Ashes series, taking two wickets in the drawn match. He was dropped in favour of Alan Connolly for the Second Test, but was recalled for the Fourth Test after taking 10 for 61 in the first innings for Queensland against Victoria in January 1966, the third-best figures recorded in Australia. However, he was injured just before the Test, and replaced by Graham McKenzie, who took 6 for 48 as Australia won by an innings.

Allan continued opening the bowling for Queensland until he retired after a successful 1968-69 season in which he headed the national averages with 46 wickets at 16.36. He served on the executive committee of the Queensland Cricket Association from 1985 to 1991. He later managed Queen Elizabeth II Stadium in Brisbane.

On 14 July 2000, Allan was awarded the Australian Sports Medal for his cricketing achievements.

References

External links
 
 Peter Allan at CricketArchive

1935 births
Living people
Australia Test cricketers
Queensland cricketers
Australian cricketers
Recipients of the Australian Sports Medal
Cricketers from Brisbane
Cricketers who have taken ten wickets in an innings
Australian cricket administrators